SAB, or Sab, may refer to:

Businesses
 The School of American Ballet in New York City
 South African Breweries
 Shipping Association of Barbados
Société Aérienne Bordelaise a French aircraft manufacturer
 Development Bank of Saxony, from its German acronym.

Literature
 Sab (novel), by Gertrudis Gomez de Avellaneda

Transport
 SAB, the IATA code for Juancho E. Yrausquin Airport, Saba, Dutch Caribbean  
 SAB, the ICAO code for Sabena, a defunct Belgian airline
 SAB, the National Rail code for Smallbrook Junction railway station on the Isle of Wight, UK

Others
 SAB TV, India
 Sab The Artist aka Musab, an American recording artist
 Surinaamse Atletiek Bond, the Suriname Athletics Federation
 Sociedade Astronômica Brasileira

See also